Wild Bird is an album by American pianist Hal Galper released on the Mainstream label in 1972.

Track listing
All compositions by Hal Galper.
 "Trilogy: Convocation" – 7:05
 "Trilogy: Wild Bird" – 8:03
 "Trilogy: Change Up" – 5:04
 "This Moment" – 11:40
 "Whatever" – 7:14

Personnel
Hal Galper – electric piano
Randy Brecker – trumpet, electric trumpet
Michael Brecker – tenor saxophone, soprano saxophone
Jonathan Graham – electric guitar
Bob Mann – electric guitar
Victor Gaskin – bass, electric bass
Charles LaChappelle  – bass, electric bass
Bill Goodwin – drums
Billy Hart – drums

References

Mainstream Records albums
Hal Galper albums
1972 albums
Albums produced by Bob Shad